CEG may refer to:

Conservative Europe Group, a political group affiliated to the UK Conservative Party
College of Engineering, Guindy, Chennai, India
Constellation Energy, based on its ticker symbol
Corvette Evolution GT, a PlayStation 2 and Nintendo DS video game
Cefaloglycin, trade name CEG
Hawarden Airport, has the IATA: CEG
Customer Experience Guidelines